Vale Summit is an unincorporated community and census-designated place (CDP) in Allegany County, Maryland, United States. As of the 2010 census it had a population of 139.

Local lore indicates that the community was so named in the mid 19th century, founded by the local population of coal miners. Previously, however, it was locally known as "Pompey Smash", the origin of which is commonly believed to have come from a slave named Pompey crashing his wagonload of coal.  A main road through the village still bears the name "Pompey Smash Road".

A paved road reached the town circa 1921, from Clarysville, along Route 40.

Demographics

References

Census-designated places in Allegany County, Maryland
Census-designated places in Maryland
Coal towns in Maryland